The London Midland and Scottish Railway (LMS) Jubilee Class is a class of steam locomotive designed for main line passenger work. 191 locomotives were built between 1934 and 1936. They were built concurrently with the similar looking LMS Stanier Class 5 4-6-0. They were nicknamed Red Staniers (due to their crimson liveries) and Jubs.

History
The last five locomotives of Henry Fowler's Patriot class on order, 5552 to 5556, were built with William Stanier's taper boiler and so became the first of the Jubilee class. 113 locomotives were ordered straight from the drawing board. They were initially a disappointment; their moderate degree of superheating often left them short of steam. Changes to the blastpipe and chimney dimensions helped to transform them.

On 29 April 1935 no. 5552, the first of the class, permanently swapped identities with no. 5642 which had been named Silver Jubilee on 19 April 1935 in recognition of the Silver Jubilee of King George V on 6 May of that year. This change gave the name to the rest of the class, see LMS Jubilee Class 5552 Silver Jubilee. Earlier on (from summer 1934), they had been known as the "Red Staniers" (because of the crimson livery), to distinguish them from the "Black Staniers" (the LMS Stanier Class 5 4-6-0 class). These engines were named after former Commonwealth states and countries of the British Empire, British admirals, British naval commanders, and finally, ships in the British Navy named after characters from Greek Mythology.

Until the late 1950s, Jubilees were the largest express engine normally found on the lines running out of St Pancras. They practically monopolized the role of the main express engine, with the occasional Royal Scot popping up, or radiating from Derby. They could nevertheless be found on main lines throughout the former LMS system. They were also regarded as a powerful upgrade from both of the older Compound 4-4-0 locomotives, both the MR 1000 Class and the LMS Compound 4-4-0 as well. The Jubilees were a rather common sight on the Midland Main Line, the West Coast Main Line, and the Settle-Carlisle line, but were eventually displaced by the much more powerful Royal Scots during the 1940s.

The power classification was 5XP, in common with the earlier Patriot class. In January 1951 the classification was revised to 6P and in November 1955 to 6P5F but this change was not applied to the locomotives' cabsides, which continued to show 6P.

Five members of the class were fitted with a double chimney at different times. 5684 Jutland was the first, fitted with a double Kylchap in 1937. The double chimney did improve the power of the locos and also improved the coal consumption. It only carried this fitment for one year. 5742 Connaught was the next, being fitted with a plain double exhaust in 1940 which it carried until 1955. 5553 Canada was also fitted in 1940 but carried the double chimney for a short time. 5735 Comet and 5736 Phoenix were rebuilt with a 2A taper boiler and double chimney in 1942. They were to have been the prototypes for the rebuilding of the entire class but were, in the end, the only Jubilees so to be treated. (They were reclassified 6P in July 1943, and 7P in 1951). As part of experiments at the Rugby Locomotive Testing Station, no. 45722 Defence was fitted with a double chimney from 1956 to 1957. In 1961 a double exhaust was fitted to no. 45596 Bahamas which carried it through withdrawal and into preservation.

Construction
Although built over only a three-year period the class had many variations due to improvements being made as they were built. The major differences were:
Boilers – 10 variations, mainly affecting the number of tubes. The earlier boilers were domeless but later boilers were domed. There were two sizes of fire grate area depending on whether the firebox throatplate was straight or sloping.
Bogies – Approximately 50 of the earlier locomotives were built with ex-Claughton bogies which had a 6 ft 3 in wheelbase compared to the later locomotives built with new bogies that had a wheelbase of 6 ft 6 in.
Smokebox Saddle –  The first 113 locomotives were built with a two piece saddle; the rest had a conventional one piece saddle.
Tenders – Four basic patterns were fitted; Fowler 3,500 gallon. Fowler high-sided (10 off), Stanier 4,000 gallon and Stanier 3,500 gallon. These last tenders were difficult to identify, combining the high curved sides of the Stanier tender with the chassis from the earlier type Fowler tender.  The easiest way to spot them is by the top row of horizontal rivets, slightly lower than on the 4,000 gallon version. However, taking into account rivets, wheelbase, and welds this can be subdivided into a total of eight patterns.

Performance
These locomotives had a bit of a mixed reception during their early working days, but while their reputation did improve over time, they didn't reach the same amount of praise as the Black 5 locomotives. When the first members were built, the original 113 batch of engines to be precise, engine crews said that they were often disappointing. Crews often said that they were poor steamers and that the older locomotives that would be eventually replaced by them often performed better. However, once the problem with these engines was found and fixed after several extensive trials took place (the problem being that the diameter of the blast pipe was too large for the engines to make proper steam), the Jubilees went from being a theoretical success to an actual success thanks to some modifications.

Withdrawal
No. 45637 Windward Islands was destroyed in a severe accident in 1952, making it the first Jubilee engine to be scrapped. The remaining 188 locomotives were withdrawn between 1960 and 1967. The first of the standard withdrawals being 45609 Gilbert and Ellice Islands in September 1960 and the last engine to be withdrawn was No. 45562 Alberta from Leeds Holbeck shed (20A) on 4 November 1967. They were the last express engines from the Big Four days still in service.

Accidents and incidents
On 21 January 1938, locomotive No. 5568 Western Australia was hauling an express passenger train which was in a head-on collision with an empty stock train at Oakley Junction due to a combination of driver and signalman's errors. Three people were killed and 46 were injured.
 On 11 October 1943, locomotive 5581 Bihar and Orissa hauling the Leeds - Edinburgh express collided with a freight train being shunted into sidings at Steeton, Yorkshire. No one was killed but four people were injured.
 On 18 May 1948, locomotives 5609 Gilbert and Ellice Islands (train loco) and 5605 Cyprus (pilot), hauling the 11:45 am down (St Pancras to Bradford) express were derailed, along with 8 coaches of a 12-coach train on a 30 ft high embankment near Wath Road Junction, Rotherham, Yorkshire. The cause was track distortion in hot weather. Poor track maintenance was a contributing factor. 8 people died and 56 were injured. Both locos were repaired at Derby Works and returned to service.
On 8 October 1952, a three-train collision occurred at Harrow & Wealdstone station, Middlesex. Locomotive No. 45637 Windward Islands was one of two locomotives hauling an express passenger train which crashed into wreckage. A total of 112 people were killed and 340 were injured. This remains the worst peacetime rail crash in the United Kingdom. The locomotive was consequently scrapped due to damage sustained.
On 16 August 1953, locomotive No. 45699 Galatea was hauling a passenger train which became divided and was derailed at Kingsbury, Warwickshire due to a combination of defects on the locomotive and the condition of the track. 
On 20 July 1959, locomotive No. 45730 Ocean overran a signal and consequently crashed into Dock Junction Signal Box, London. Trains had to be handsignalled into and out of  station for several days afterwards.
On 17 January 1964, No. 45695 Minotaur was involved in a head-on collision with a mail train and a freight train. The locomotive was deemed to be uneconomical to repair and was withdrawn and scrapped off-site.

Details

Preservation 
Four Jubilees have been preserved, two each built by Crewe Works and by North British. 45593 and 45596 were purchased directly from BR for preservation. The other two were rescued from Woodham Brothers. All four have operated in preservation and all have run on the main line.

Three members of the class are (in 2023) operational: 45596 Bahamas, 45690 Leander  and 45699 Galatea. All three are mainline certified. 45593 Kolhapur is stored inside the shed at Tyseley Loco Works awaiting overhaul.

A large number of parts were taken from sister engine 45562 Alberta, which was the subject matter of a few preservation attempts, one of them even tried to persuade Sir Billy Butlin to buy it, that failed before she was scrapped in 1968 and most parts exist on preserved sister engine Galatea.

Note: Marked names indicate that the loco is not presently wearing them. Loco numbers in bold mean their current number.

Gallery

Preservation photos

Model railways
Mainline Railways' catalogue included OO gauge LMS Jubilees with Fowler tenders in 1983; in LMS crimson, BR green and BR lined black liveries. Mainline also had a limited availability of other OO gauge Jubilee 5XPs the same year; an LMS crimson model of Leander and a BR green model of Orion. Graham Farish have produced various N gauge Jubilee models, including (in 2013) 5664 'Nelson' in LMS crimson and 45572 'Eire' in British Railways lined green with late crest.

Notes

References

External links

 Jubilees
 Class JUBE Details at Rail UK
 

 
4-6-0 locomotives
6 Jubilee
NBL locomotives
Railway locomotives introduced in 1934
Standard gauge steam locomotives of Great Britain
2′C h3 locomotives
Passenger locomotives